Leakesville is a town in and the county seat of Greene County, Mississippi, United States. It is located along the Chickasawhay River in Greene County, Mississippi, United States. It is served by the junction of Mississippi routes 57 and 63. As of the 2010 census, the rural town population was 898, down from 1,026 at the 2000 census.

History
Like most of Mississippi, this area was part of the traditional territory of the historic Choctaw. Under the Indian Removal Act of 1830, they were forced to cede their lands in this area to the United States. The Choctaw were the first of the Southeast Five Civilized Tribes to be removed to Indian Territory (now Oklahoma), west of the Mississippi River. Some members remained in the state and their descendants have maintained cultural identity. They gained federal recognition as the Mississippi Band of Choctaw Indians.

A post office called Leakesville has been in operation since 1829, when European Americans established a settlement here. The town was named for Walter Leake, third governor of Mississippi. The area was developed for cotton plantations in the nineteenth century, and remains mostly rural.

In 1927, an African-American man named Bernice Raspberry, aged 23, who had been arrested for alleged improper conduct with a white woman, was taken from the jail and lynched.

Geography
Leakesville is in southeastern Greene County, on the west side of the Chickasawhay River, a south-flowing tributary of the Pascagoula River.

Demographics

2020 census

As of the 2020 United States census, there were 3,775 people, 340 households, and 241 families residing in the town. The sudden population increase and shift in racial demographics can be explained by the annexation of the South Mississippi Correctional Institution.

2010 census
As of the 2010 United States Census, There were 898 people living in the town. 78.0% were White, 20.0% African American, 0.1% Asian, 0.3% of some other race and 1.2% of two or more races. 2.3% were Hispanic or Latino of any race.

2000 census
As of the census of 2000, there were 1,026 people, 390 households, and 262 families living in the town. The population density was 647.9 people per square mile (250.7/km2). There were 463 housing units at an average density of 292.4 per square mile (113.1/km2). The racial makeup of the town was 79.92% White, 19.40% African American, 0.10% Native American, 0.10% Asian, 0.49% from other races. Hispanic or Latino people of any race were 1.07% of the population.

There were 390 households, out of which 27.2% had children under the age of 18 living with them, 51.0% were married couples living together, 14.9% had a female householder with no husband present, and 32.6% were non-families. 29.7% of all households were made up of individuals, and 14.9% had someone living alone who was 65 years of age or older. The average household size was 2.34 and the average family size was 2.92.

In the town, the population was spread out, with 21.5% under the age of 18, 8.1% from 18 to 24, 19.6% from 25 to 44, 23.5% from 45 to 64, and 27.3% who were 65 years of age or older. The median age was 46 years. For every 100 females, there were 71.6 males. For every 100 females age 18 and over, there were 66.0 males.

The median income for a household in the town was $26,731, and the median income for a family was $33,618. Males had a median income of $30,208 versus $19,167 for females. The per capita income for the town was $14,674. About 17.0% of families and 21.5% of the population were below the poverty line, including 38.0% of those under age 18 and 12.3% of those age 65 or over.

Government and infrastructure

The Mississippi Department of Corrections South Mississippi Correctional Institution is located in unincorporated Greene County, near Leakesville.

Education
Leakesville is served by the Greene County School District. Schools include Greene County High School, Leakesville Junior High School, and Leakesville Elementary School.

Notable people
 Don Churchwell, NFL player
 Kermit Davis, Head Coach at Ole Miss
 Dennis DeBar, member of the Mississippi State Senate
 Reed Green, former head football coach and athletic director for the University of Southern Mississippi
 Bill Hicks, comedian, buried in Magnolia Cemetery
 Jerry Lott, rockabilly singer
 Wilmer Mizell, MLB pitcher and congressman
 Walter Packer, NFL player

References

Cities in Greene County, Mississippi
Cities in Mississippi
County seats in Mississippi